Bonsuoko is a community near Senya Breku in the Awutu Senya West District in the Central Region of Ghana. The Bonsouko Rainbow Stars are located in Bonsuoko. Vegetables such as tomatoes are cultivated in Bonsuoko.

References 

Central Region (Ghana)
Communities in Ghana